The Mitong is a river of southwestern mainland Equatorial Guinea. It forms part of the Muni Estuary along with the Congue River, Mandyani River, Mitimele River, Utamboni River and Mven River.

References

Rivers of Equatorial Guinea